Suzhou Lakeside New City, also called Eastern Taihu Lakeside New City (used in Wuzhong District) or Wujiang Lakeside New City (used in Wujiang District), is a new city located in the southern part of Suzhou, China. It is a "city" in the "one core, four cities" plan of Suzhou. The initial phase of it occupies an area of 10.05 km2.

See also
Suzhou High-Speed Rail New City

References

Geography of Suzhou
Wuzhong District
Wujiang District, Suzhou